Cagayan's 1st congressional district is one of the three congressional districts of the Philippines in the province of Cagayan. It has been represented in the House of Representatives of the Philippines since 1916 and earlier in the Philippine Assembly from 1907 to 1916. The district consists of Cagayan's former capital, Lal-lo, and adjacent municipalities of Alcala, Aparri, Baggao, Buguey, Camalaniugan, Gattaran, Gonzaga, Santa Ana and Santa Teresita. It is currently represented in the 19th Congress by Ramon C. Nolasco Jr. of the Nationalist People's Coalition (NPC).

Representation history

Election results

2016

2013

2010

See also
Legislative districts of Cagayan

References

Congressional districts of the Philippines
Politics of Cagayan
1907 establishments in the Philippines
Congressional districts of Cagayan Valley
Constituencies established in 1907